Izzy I. Ford (née Gray; born 19 January 1974) is a New Zealand local-body politician and former rugby union player. She served as deputy mayor of Porirua from 2016 to 2022.

Early life and family
Ford was born in Porirua on 19 January 1974, and was educated at Bishop Viard College. She is married to Glynn Ford, and they have three children, including Jayden Ford, who in January 2022 was the 399th-ranked amateur golfer in the world.

Rugby union
Ford made her debut for the New Zealand women's national rugby team, the Black Ferns, against Canada at Palmerston North in 1999. She was named in the 2002 Women's Rugby World Cup squad for New Zealand.

In 2017, Ford became the first woman appointed to the Wellington Rugby Board for 20 years; Fran Wilde had served on the board in 1996.

Local politics
Ford was first elected as a Porirua city councillor for the Eastern Ward in 2013. She was re-elected in 2016 and 2019, when she was the top-polling candidate in the Eastern Ward. Ford stood for the Porirua mayoralty at the 2019 local-body elections, and finished third out of six candidates. She served as the deputy mayor of Porirua from 2016 to 2022. Ford was re-elected to the council in the 2022 local elections for the Onepoto Ward.

References

1974 births
Living people
Rugby union players from Porirua
New Zealand women's international rugby union players
New Zealand female rugby union players
Porirua City Councillors
Deputy mayors of places in New Zealand
New Zealand sports executives and administrators
People educated at Bishop Viard College